Ethmia octanoma is a moth in the family Depressariidae. It is endemic to Taiwan.

The larvae feed on Ehretia resinosa and Ehretia dicksonii.

References

Moths described in 1914
octanoma